Stefan Küng (born 16 November 1993) is a Swiss cyclist, who currently rides for UCI WorldTeam . He is also a citizen of Liechtenstein.

Career
Küng won the individual pursuit at the 2015 UCI Track Cycling World Championships, after beating Jack Bobridge in the final. Küng only took the lead in the final . In the 2015 Tour de Romandie, he grabbed the biggest victory of his career at that point in solo fashion. On a cold rainy day, he was part of the early breakaway and dropped his fellow escapees some  before the line, resisting to their return while riding toward victory in Fribourg. In June 2017, he was named in the startlist for the 2017 Tour de France.

Major results

Road

2010
 7th Overall Tour du Pays de Vaud
2011
 National Junior Championships
1st  Time trial
3rd Road race
 1st Tour de Berne juniors
 Games of the Small States of Europe
2nd  Road race
2nd  Time trial
 3rd Overall Driedaagse van Axel
 3rd Overall Tour du Pays de Vaud
1st Stage 6
 10th Overall Grand Prix Rüebliland
2013
 National Under-23 Championships
1st  Time trial
3rd Road race
 Games of the Small States of Europe
1st  Time trial
5th Road race
 1st Giro del Belvedere
 3rd Chrono Champenois
 6th Time trial, UCI World Under-23 Championships
 9th Tour de Berne
2014
 UEC European Under-23 Championships
1st  Road race
1st  Time trial
 1st  Overall Tour de Normandie
1st  Young rider classification
1st Prologue
 1st Flèche Ardennaise
 2nd Time trial, National Road Championships
 3rd  Time trial, UCI World Under-23 Championships
 4th Chrono Champenois
 8th Tour de Berne
 10th Omloop Het Nieuwsblad U23
2015
 1st  Team time trial, UCI World Championships
 1st Volta Limburg Classic
 1st Stage 4 Tour de Romandie
 4th Overall Three Days of De Panne
2016
 1st Stage 5 (TTT) Eneco Tour
 2nd  Team time trial, UCI World Championships
 7th Overall Three Days of De Panne
 9th Overall Ster ZLM Toer
2017
 National Championships
1st  Time trial
2nd Road race
 Tour de Romandie
1st  Points classification
1st Stage 2
 1st Stage 2 (ITT) BinckBank Tour
 1st Stage 1 (TTT) Tirreno–Adriatico
 1st Stage 1 (TTT) Volta a la Comunitat Valenciana
 2nd  Team time trial, UCI World Championships
 3rd Overall Tour of Britain
 Tour de France
Held  after Stages 1–2
2018
 1st  Time trial, National Championships
 Tour de Suisse
1st Stages 1 (TTT) & 9 (ITT)
 1st Stage 2 (ITT) BinckBank Tour
 1st Stage 3 (TTT) Tour de France
 1st Stage 1 (TTT) Tirreno–Adriatico
 1st Stage 3 (TTT) Volta a la Comunitat Valenciana
 3rd  Team time trial, UCI World Championships
 7th Time trial, UEC European Championships
 10th E3 Harelbeke
2019
 1st  Time trial, National Championships
 1st Tour du Doubs
 1st Stage 2 Tour de Romandie
 1st Stage 3 (ITT) Volta ao Algarve
 UCI World Championships
3rd  Road race
10th Time trial
 3rd Overall Okolo Slovenska
1st Stage 1b (ITT)
 4th Time trial, UEC European Championships
 8th Overall BinckBank Tour
 9th Binche–Chimay–Binche
2020
 1st  Time trial, UEC European Championships
 National Championships
1st  Time trial
1st  Road race
 3rd  Time trial, UCI World Championships
 3rd Overall BinckBank Tour
 5th Gent–Wevelgem
 8th Three Days of Bruges–De Panne
 9th Omloop Het Nieuwsblad
 Tour de France
 Combativity award Stages 10 & 14
2021
 1st  Time trial, UEC European Championships
 1st  Time trial, National Championships
 1st  Overall Volta a la Comunitat Valenciana
1st Stage 4 (ITT)
 1st Chrono des Nations
 1st Stage 1 (ITT) Tour de Suisse
 4th Time trial, Olympic Games
 5th Time trial, UCI World Championships
 5th Overall Benelux Tour
 6th Gent–Wevelgem
2022
 UCI World Championships
1st  Team relay
2nd  Time trial
 1st  Overall Tour Poitou-Charentes en Nouvelle-Aquitaine
1st Stage 3b (ITT)
 1st Chrono des Nations
 2nd  Time trial, UEC European Championships
 3rd Paris–Roubaix
 3rd E3 Saxo Bank Classic
 5th Overall Tour de Suisse
 5th Tour of Flanders
 6th Dwars door Vlaanderen
 7th Overall Volta ao Algarve
 7th Tour du Doubs
 8th Amstel Gold Race
2023
 5th Overall Volta ao Algarve
1st Stage 5 (ITT)

Grand Tour general classification results timeline

Classics results timeline

Track

2011
 1st  Madison (with Théry Schir), UEC European Junior Championships
 1st  Omnium, National Junior Championships
2013
 UEC European Under-23 Championships
1st  Individual pursuit
1st  Team pursuit
2nd  Madison (with Théry Schir)
 1st  Individual pursuit, National Championships
 3rd  Individual pursuit, UCI World Championships
2014
 UEC European Under-23 Championships
1st  Individual pursuit
1st  Team pursuit
 UCI World Championships
2nd  Individual pursuit
3rd  Madison (with Théry Schir)
2015
 1st  Individual pursuit, UCI World Championships
 UEC European Championships
1st  Individual pursuit
2nd  Team pursuit
 National Championships
1st  Individual pursuit
1st  Points race
1st  Madison (with Théry Schir)

References

External links

BMC Racing team profile

1993 births
Living people
Swiss male cyclists
Liechtenstein male cyclists
People from Wil
Olympic cyclists of Switzerland
Cyclists at the 2020 Summer Olympics
Sportspeople from the canton of St. Gallen
Tour de Suisse stage winners
UCI Road World Champions (elite men)